Hollister is a town in Tillman County, Oklahoma, United States. The population was 50 at the 2010 census, a decline of 16.7 percent from 60 in 2000.

History
The Wichita Falls and Northwestern Railway (later the Missouri, Kansas and Texas Railway) founded Hollister in 1907 as  a depot on its line from Wichita Falls, Texas to Frederick, Oklahoma. Hollister was built between the towns of Isadore and Parton. Many of its buildings were moved from Parton. Originally, this was the location of a railroad switch known as "Happy Jack," "Happy Spur," or just "Happy." The first station was a boxcar, and the first train arrived on November 16, 1907. The town was named for Harry L. Hollister, the depot agent in Frederick. A post office was established on February 1, 1909.

Hollister's population peaked at 200 in 1940, then began a decline to 105 in 1970. The high school closed in 1963 and the grade school in 1968. At the turn of the 21st Century, Hollister had a post office, a Baptist church and two grain elevators.

Geography
Hollister is located at  (34.342767, -98.872006).

Climate

Demographics

As of the census of 2000, there were 60 people, 20 households, and 17 families residing in the town. There were 25 housing units at an average density of 102.2 per square mile (40.2/km2). The racial makeup of the town was 86.67% White, 10.00% from other races, and 3.33% from two or more races. Hispanic or Latino of any race were 10.00% of the population.

There were 20 households, out of which 30.0% had children under the age of 18 living with them, 75.0% were married couples living together, and 15.0% were non-families. 15.0% of all households were made up of individuals, and none had someone living alone who was 65 years of age or older. The average household size was 3.00 and the average family size was 3.29.

In the town, the population was spread out, with 28.3% under the age of 18, 1.7% from 18 to 24, 31.7% from 25 to 44, 28.3% from 45 to 64, and 10.0% who were 65 years of age or older. The median age was 37 years. For every 100 females, there were 140.0 males. For every 100 females age 18 and over, there were 138.9 males.

The median income for a household in the town was $21,250, and the median income for a family was $26,250. Males had a median income of $18,750 versus $21,250 for females. The per capita income for the town was $7,888. There were 26.7% of families and 39.3% of the population living below the poverty line, including 39.1% of under eighteens and none of those over 64.

References

External links
 Encyclopedia of Oklahoma History and Culture - Hollister

Towns in Tillman County, Oklahoma
Towns in Oklahoma